Boris Becker won in the final 6–4, 6–3, 7–6 against Sergio Casal.

Seeds
A champion seed is indicated in bold text while text in italics indicates the round in which that seed was eliminated.

  Boris Becker (champion)
  Yannick Noah (quarterfinals)
  Henri Leconte (semifinals)
  Miloslav Mečíř (first round)
  John McEnroe (quarterfinals)
  Mikael Pernfors (quarterfinals)
 n/a
  Tim Mayotte (semifinals)

Draw

 NB: The Final was the best of 5 sets while all other rounds were the best of 3 sets.

Final

Section 1

Section 2

External links
 1986 Paris Open draw

Singles